Rewat Sirinukul (25 February 1936 – 26 September 2021) was a Thai politician.

From 1983 to 2011, he served as a member of the House of Representatives of Thailand representing the Thai Liberal Party.

Sirinukul died from COVID-19 in 2021, aged 85.

References 

1936 births
2021 deaths
Members of the House of Representatives (Thailand)
Deaths from the COVID-19 pandemic in Thailand